The Fort Wayne Community Schools (FWCS) corporation is the Fort Wayne, Indiana area public school district, and is the  largest in Indiana. The second largest is the Indianapolis Public Schools. It operates five high schools, ten middle schools, one intermediate school (1-8 grades) and over thirty elementary schools, serving 30,992 students (nearly 3% of Indiana's K-12 population) in 2012-2013. FWCS's current superintendent is Dr. Mark Daniel. FWCS is divided into several departments, including Technology, Transportation, Academic Services, Continuing Education, Nutrition Services, and Public Affairs.

School Board
The FWCS Board of School Trustees serves as the district's governing and fiscal body, and its meetings are open to the public in the Grile Administrative Center in downtown Fort Wayne and broadcast on local cable channels, Comcast 54 and FiOS/Frontier 24. The School Board approves the FWCS tax rate and any borrowing that will be paid off by property taxes. Current FWCS board members include Steve Corona, Anne Duff, Julie Hollingsworth, Rohli Booker, Jennifer Matthias, Maria Norman and Noah Smith. <https://www.fwcs.k12.in.us/board-members>

Property Tax Remonstrace
On April 23, 2007, the School Board voted to fight a remonstrance by property tax payers in the FWCS district opposing a $500 million Facilities Improvement Plan. The organization Code Blue Schools led the remonstrance. Remonstrance petitions were submitted to the Allen County Auditor on July 1, 2007. Those against the $500 million bond issue submitted over 33,000 signatures, in contrast with the 11,000 signatures collected in favor of the bond issue.

Closing Elmhurst High School
On March 22, 2010, a vote was taken by the FWCS School Board to accept a recommendation of the FWCS administration regarding ways to reduce the 2010 district budget by $15 million.  The administration's report included the step of closing Elmhurst High School.  The budget moves were required because current economic conditions reduced federal and state funds available to the school district.  The closing of Elmhurst has been a highly debated topic over the past several years, and the Board, by a unanimous vote of 7-0, agreed to accept the administration's recommendation.  With that action, the 2009/10 school year was the final year of operations for the school.  Returning students were reallocated to other high schools in the FWCS system.

School Directory
As well as offering public education during the day, FWCS offers continuing education classes and events that meet in its buildings in the evenings and on weekends (Saturday and Sunday).

High schools

North Side High School
Northrop High School
R. Nelson Snider High School
South Side High School
Wayne High School

Middle schools

Blackhawk Middle School
Jefferson Middle School
Kekionga Middle School
Lakeside Middle School
Lane Middle School
Memorial Park Middle School
Miami Middle School
Northwood Middle School
Portage Middle School
Shawnee Middle School
Towles Intermediate Montessori School

Intermediate school
Towles Intermediate School (Grades 1-8)

Elementary schools

Abbett Elementary School
Adams Elementary School
Arlington Elementary School
Bloomingdale Elementary School
Brentwood Elementary School
Bunche Montessori Early Childhood Ctr.
Croninger Elementary School
Fairfield Elementary School
Forest Park Elementary School
Franke Park Elementary School
Glenwood Park Elementary School
Haley Elementary School
Harris Elementary School
Harrison Hill Elementary School
Holland Elementary School
Indian Village Elementary School
Irwin Elementary School
Levan Scott Academy
Lincoln Elementary School
Lindley Elementary School
Maplewood Elementary School
Nebraska Elementary School (Closed in 2016)
Northcrest Elementary School
Price Elementary School
Shambaugh Elementary School
South Wayne Elementary School
St Joseph Central Elementary School
Study Elementary School
Washington Center Elementary School
Washington Elementary School
Waynedale Elementary School
Weisser Park Elementary School
Young Early Childhood Center

Other Facilities
Anthis Career Center
L.C. Ward Education Center

References

External links

Indiana Department of Education corporation snapshot

School districts in Indiana
Education in Fort Wayne, Indiana
Education in Allen County, Indiana